Mathilde Hubertine Maria Francisca "Til" Gardeniers-Berendsen (18 February 1925 – 22 October 2019) was a Dutch politician of the defunct Catholic People's Party (KVP) and later the Christian Democratic Appeal (CDA) party and nonprofit director.

Biography
On 14 May 1940 Gardeniers-Berendsen witnessed the Luftwaffe bombing of Rotterdam during the German invasion and joined the Dutch resistance against the German occupiers in 1940.  Following the end of World War II Gardeniers-Berendsen worked as a secretary in Rotterdam from August 1945 until May 1971.

Gardeniers-Berendsen was elected as a Member of the House of Representatives after the election of 1971, taking office on 11 May 1971. After the election of 1977 Gardeniers-Berendsen was appointed as Minister of Culture, Recreation and Social Work in the Cabinet Van Agt–Wiegel, taking office on 19 December 1977. After the election of 1981 Gardeniers-Berendsen returned as a Member of the House of Representatives, taking office on 10 June 1981. Following the cabinet formation of 1981 Gardeniers-Berendsen was appointment as Minister of Health and Environment in the Cabinet Van Agt II, taking office on 11 September 1981. The Cabinet Van Agt II fell just seven months into its term on 12 May 1982 and continued to serve in a demissionary capacity until it was replaced by the caretaker Cabinet Van Agt III with Gardeniers-Berendsen continuing as Minister of Health and Environment, taking office on 29 May 1982. After the election of 1982 Gardeniers-Berendsen again returned as a Member of the House of Representatives, taking office on 21 September 1982. Gardeniers-Berendsen served again as acting Minister of Culture, Recreation and Social Work during a medical leave of absence of Hans de Boer dual serving in both positions from 11 October 1982. Following the cabinet formation of 1982 Gardeniers-Berendsen was not given a cabinet post in the new cabinet, the Cabinet Van Agt III was replaced by the Cabinet Lubbers I on 4 November 1982 and she continued to serve as a frontbencher.

In February 1983 Gardeniers-Berendsen was nominated as a Member of the Council of State, she resigned as a Member of the House of Representatives on 23 February 1983 and was installed as a Member of the Council of State, serving from 1 March 1983 until 1 March 1995. She was the second oldest living former cabinet member after former State Secretary Els Veder-Smit and the oldest living former cabinet minister since the death of Johan Witteveen on 23 April 2019.

Decorations

References

External links

Official
  M.H.M.F. (Til) Gardeniers-Berendsen Parlement & Politiek

 

1925 births
2019 deaths
Catholic People's Party politicians
Christian Democratic Appeal politicians
Commanders of the Order of Leopold II
Commanders of the Order of the Netherlands Lion
Dutch nonprofit directors
Resistance members from Rotterdam
Dutch Roman Catholics
Grand Officers of the Order of Orange-Nassau
Knights of the Holy Sepulchre
Members of the Council of State (Netherlands)
Members of the House of Representatives (Netherlands)
Ministers of Health of the Netherlands
Ministers of Social Work of the Netherlands
Ministers of Sport of the Netherlands
Ministers of Culture of the Netherlands 
Municipal councillors of Rotterdam
Secretaries
Women government ministers of the Netherlands
20th-century Dutch civil servants
20th-century Dutch women politicians
20th-century Dutch politicians